Eich may refer to:

Places
 Eich, Rhineland-Palatinate, Germany
 Eich (Verbandsgemeinde), a collective municipality in Alzey-Worms, Rhineland-Palatinate, Germany
 Eich, Switzerland
 Eich, Luxembourg

Other uses
 Eich (surname)

See also 

 Aich (disambiguation)
 Eiche (disambiguation)